Jekaterina Golovatenko (born 15 October 1979 in Keila) is an Estonian former competitive figure skater. She is a multiple medalist at the Estonian Championships. Her highest placement at an ISU championship was 21st at the 1998 European Championships.

Programs

Competitive highlights

References

External links
 

1979 births
Living people
People from Keila
Estonian female single skaters
Estonian people of Russian descent
Competitors at the 2001 Winter Universiade